Sir Bartholomew Dillon (died 1533) was a leading Irish judge of the sixteenth century who held the offices of Chief Baron of the Irish Exchequer and Lord Justice of Ireland.

Birth and origins 
Bartholomew was born at Riverston, County Meath, eldest son of Sir James Dillon and his wife Elizabeth Bathe. His father was a Baron of the Exchequer. His father's family was Old English and descended from Sir Henry Dillon who came to Ireland with Prince John in 1185. His mother was a daughter of Bartholomew Bathe of Dollardstown Castle, Athy, County Kildare.

He leads the list of his brothers below as the eldest:

Bartholomew (died 1533)
Gerald
Robert (died 1579), became Chief Justice of the Irish Common Pleas
Thomas, prior of St Peter of Trim
Edmund, prior of St. John's Priory, Trim, and prior of Lusk

He had two sisters:
Elizabeth, married a Cusack of Portrane
Thomasine, married John Delafield

Marriages and children 
Dillon married twice. His first wife was Elizabeth Barnewall, only daughter of Thomas Barnewall of Irishtown, who was the second son of Thomas Barnewall, 7th Baron Trimleston.

Bartholomew and Elizabeth had a son:
Thomas (living in 1541), married Anne, daughter of Sir Thomas Luttrell, and was father of Sir Robert Dillon

—and two daughters:
Anne, married Nicholas Kent of Davidstown
Ismay, married three times. First to John Fleming of Stephenstown, a grandson of James Fleming, 7th Baron Slane, and was the mother of Thomas Fleming, 10th Baron Slane. Secondly to Richard Tath of Cookstown, and thirdly to Sir Thomas Barnewall, second son of John Barnewall, 3rd Baron Trimlestown and his eldest child by his second wife Margaret FitzLeones.

Dillon's younger brother Robert founded the branch of the family that would later hold the title Earl of Roscommon. By birth and marriage the Dillon brothers belonged to the small Anglo-Irish ruling class of the Pale.

Career 
Dillon was an official at the Court of Exchequer (Ireland) by 1505 and became a Baron of the Exchequer in 1507. He was promoted Chief Baron in 1514 but removed after a year, for reasons unknown. He was Deputy Treasurer of Ireland from 1516 to 1522, when he became a judge of the Court of King's Bench (Ireland). On 15 January 1533 he was made Lord Chief Justice of the King's Bench for Ireland but died suddenly soon after.

According to Elrington Ball, at a time when the Irish ruling class were deeply split between supporters (the so-called Geraldines) and opponents of the 9th Earl of Kildare, Dillon was one of the most committed Geraldines, and spent much of his time in England defending the Earl of Kildare's interests.

Notes and references

Notes

Citations

Sources 

  – 1221 to 1690
  – S to T (for Slane)
 
  – Viscounts
 
 

1533 deaths
15th-century Irish judges
16th-century Irish judges
16th-century Irish politicians
Chief Barons of the Irish Exchequer
Lords chief justice of Ireland
People from County Meath
Year of birth unknown